Richard John Simpson (c. 1885 – ?) was a rugby union player who represented Australia.

Simpson, a fullback, was born in Sydney and claimed 1 international rugby cap for Australia.

References

                   

Australian rugby union players
Australia international rugby union players
Year of birth uncertain
Year of death missing
Rugby union players from Sydney
Rugby union fullbacks